Li Lun may refer to:

 One of the names used by Emperor Ruizong of Tang
 Li Lun (general), People's Liberation Army general
 Li Lun, Lad of Courage, children's novel